Flin Flon Airport  is located  southeast of Flin Flon, Manitoba, Canada, in the community of Bakers Narrows, on the shores of Lake Athapapuskow.

Airlines and destinations

See also
Flin Flon/Channing Water Aerodrome
Flin Flon/Bakers Narrows Water Aerodrome

References

External links
Page about this airport on COPA's Places to Fly airport directory

Certified airports in Manitoba
Flin Flon